Midnight in Washington: How We Almost Lost Our Democracy and Still Could is a memoir written by Congressman Adam Schiff and published in 2021 by Random House. The book mainly recounts the effects of the Trump presidency. The book debuted at number one on The New York Times nonfiction best-seller list for the week ending October 16, 2021.

References

External links

Commonwealth Club of California. Interview. Video. YouTube.  
Good Morning America interview with George Stephanopoulos. Video. ABC News. 
NPR Author interview
KPR interview

2021 non-fiction books
American non-fiction books
Biographies about politicians
Books about American politicians
Books about the Trump administration
English-language books
Criticism of Donald Trump
Books about Donald Trump
Random House books